Robert Sanders (1727–1783), pseudonym Nathaniel Spencer, was a Scottish hack writer in London.

Life
The son of Thomas Sanders, he was born at Breadalbane, Scotland, and was apprenticed to a comb-maker. He taught himself some Latin, Greek, and Hebrew, and taught in schools in the north of England.

About 1760 Sanders came to London, and took to hack writing. A begging letter of 1768 mentions a wife and five young children. He haunted the London coffee-houses: the New England, St. Paul's, and New Slaughter's.

Sanders was a self-created LL.D., who quarreled with booksellers and patrons. He died of a pulmonary disorder, on 24 March 1783.

Works
Compilations by Sanders included:

 The Newgate Calendar, or Malefactor's Bloody Register (1764), which came out in numbers, and was republished in five volumes. 
 Editorial work on the History of the Life of Henry II (1769 edition) by George Lyttelton, 1st Baron Lyttelton
 The Complete English Traveller, or a New Survey and Description of England and Wales, containing a full account of what is curious and entertaining in the several counties, the isles of Man, Jersey, and Guernsey … and a description of Scotland (1771, weekly part publication, reissued under the pseudonym of Nathaniel Spencer). This work largely relied on John Ray, Daniel Defoe, Thomas Pennant, and similar authors.,
 The Christian's Divine Library, illustrated with Notes, (two volume 1774, reissue after part publication; known as Southwell's Bible,  appearing as it did as by Henry Southwell, LL.D., rector of Asterby, Lincolnshire, who lent his name for a fee.
The Lucubrations of Gaffer Graybeard, containing many curious particulars relating to the Manners of the People in England during the Present Age; including the Present State of Religion particularly among the Protestant Dissenters, (1774, 4 vols., anonymous). It satirised leading London nonconformist ministers, such as John Gill and Thomas Gibbons.

He left a chronological work unfinished.

Notes

Attribution

1727 births
1783 deaths
Scottish writers
People from Perthshire